Carex lancifolia is a tussock-forming species of perennial sedge in the family Cyperaceae. It is native to parts of central China.

See also
List of Carex species

References

lancifolia
Plants described in 1903
Taxa named by Charles Baron Clarke
Flora of China